Hydrangea scandens is a species of shrub in the flowering plant family Hydrangeaceae. It is native to Japan, where it is found from the Kantō region southward. 

Its leaves are 4-7 cm long, toothed, and have acuminate tips. Flowers are produced in May through June.

It is sometimes considered to be a subspecies of Hydrangea anomala, under synonymy with Hydrangea petiolaris.

References

scandens
Flora of Japan